John Thomas Johnston (March 28, 1890 – March 7, 1940) was a Major League Baseball left fielder who played with the St. Louis Browns in .

External links

1890 births
1940 deaths
Major League Baseball left fielders
Baseball players from Texas
St. Louis Browns players
Minor league baseball managers
Waco Navigators players
San Antonio Bronchos players
Montgomery Rebels players
Chattanooga Lookouts players
New Orleans Pelicans (baseball) players
Beaumont Oilers players
Shreveport Gassers players
Wichita Falls Spudders players
Longview Cannibals players